Nieuwpoort is the name of:
 Nieuwpoort, Belgium, a town in Belgium
 Battle of Nieuwpoort (1600)
 Nieuwpoort, Curaçao, a village and tourist resort in Curaçao
 Nieuwpoort, South Holland, a town in South Holland

People with the surname
 Lars Nieuwpoort (born 1994), Dutch footballer
 Sven Nieuwpoort (born 1993), Dutch footballer

See also
 Nieuwspoort